Juan Enrique Castro Prieto (born 1 November 1959) is a Chilean politician who served as a member of the Senate of Chile. Similarly, he was mayor of Talca.

References

External links
 BCN Profile

1959 births
Living people
People from Talca
21st-century Chilean politicians
Senators of the LV Legislative Period of the National Congress of Chile
Mayors of places in Chile